Boguslawsky is a lunar impact crater that is located near the southern lunar limb, to the northwest of the slightly larger crater Demonax, and southwest of the concentric crater Boussingault. Due to its location, this crater appears very oblong in shape because of foreshortening.

The floor of this crater is flooded and relatively featureless. The rim is somewhat worn and relatively low above the surrounding surface. The crater Boguslawsky D lies across the eastern rim.

The crater was named after German astronomer Palm Heinrich Ludwig von Boguslawski. It has been proposed as the landing site for the Russian Luna 25 lander.

Satellite craters 

By convention these features are identified on lunar maps by placing the letter on the side of the crater midpoint that is closest to Boguslawsky.

References 

 
 
 
 
 
 
 
 
 
 
 
 

Impact craters on the Moon